The Lotus and the Robot is a 1960 book by Arthur Koestler, in which the author explores eastern mysticism. Although later dated by Westerners' greater exposure to Oriental practices, it concentrates mainly on Indian and Japanese traditions,  which form the two parts—the "lotus" and the "robot" respectively.

The book was banned in India for its negative portrayal of Gandhi.

References

1960 non-fiction books
Books by Arthur Koestler
English-language books
Hinduism studies books
Macmillan Publishers books
Shinto
Book censorship in India